Pekka Lyyski (born July 26, 1953) is a Finnish former football coach.

In 2003 Lyyski took charge of the IFK Mariehamn and brought the team in two years from Kakkonen to Veikkausliiga for the 2005 season for the first time in club history. He served as the coach of Mariehamn for 12 years before retiring in 2015.

His son Jani played for IFK Mariehamn.

References

1953 births
Living people
Finnish football managers
IFK Mariehamn managers
People from Kokkola
Sportspeople from Central Ostrobothnia